Jack Prestwidge (born 28 February 1996) is an Australian cricketer. He made his List A debut for Queensland in the 2018–19 JLT One-Day Cup on 22 September 2018. He made his Twenty20 debut for the Brisbane Heat in the 2018–19 Big Bash League season on 17 January 2019.

In May 2020, Prestwidge signed with Victorian Premier Cricket club Melbourne, confirming his departure from Queensland.

Personal life
Prestwidge is the son of cricketer Scott Prestwidge. His brother Will Prestwidge, and his sister Georgia Prestwidge, are also cricketers.

References

External links
 

1996 births
Living people
Australian cricketers
Brisbane Heat cricketers
Melbourne Renegades cricketers
Queensland cricketers
Place of birth missing (living people)